Antipolo, officially the City of Antipolo, is a 1st class component city and capital of the province of Rizal, Philippines. According to the 2020 census, it has a population of 887,399 people. It is the most populous city in the Calabarzon region, and the seventh most-populous city in the Philippines.

Antipolo was converted from a municipality into a component city of Rizal Province on April 4, 1998, under Republic Act No. 8508. A new provincial capitol building was inaugurated in the city in March 2009 to replace the old capitol in Pasig, which has long been outside the jurisdiction of Rizal Province, since Pasig was included in Metro Manila in 1975. With the transfer of the provincial government to Antipolo, it is highly favored to be officially designated as the new capital of the province. On March 14, 2011, Antipolo was declared according to Proclamation No. 124 s. 2011 a highly-urbanized city by then President Benigno S. Aquino; however, the proclamation has yet to be ratified in a plebiscite. Pending a plebiscite, Antipolo is the most populated city in the Philippines under a component city status. On June 19, 2020, President Rodrigo Duterte signed Republic Act 11475, designating Antipolo City as the official capital of Rizal Province. It took effect on July 7, 2020.

The city is popular for being a pilgrimage site. It prides itself as the "Pilgrimage Capital of the Philippines". The Marian image of the Our Lady of Peace and Good Voyage or the Virgin of Antipolo, which was brought in from Mexico in 1626, and enshrined in the Antipolo Cathedral has a continuous following among Filipino Catholics since the Spanish colonial era. A popular custom of pilgrimages to the Virgin of Antipolo is the trek going to its shrine on the eves of Good Friday and May 1, from various locations in Rizal Province and Metro Manila. The most notable of these pilgrimages would begin the trek from the Minor Basilica of the Black Nazarene (Quiapo Church), in Quiapo, Manila following the procession of the image. There is also an existing custom to have new cars blessed at the church in the belief that this will ensure the safety of the car and its passengers, and also preferred by outgoing OFWs to ensure their success in abroad.

Its higher elevation than that of Metro Manila affords it a scenic view of the metropolis, especially at night. Its locally grown mangoes and cashews are popular among tourists, as well as suman – a local delicacy made out of glutinous rice. The Hinulugang Taktak National Park, which was once a popular summer get-away is being restored to become again one of the city's primary attractions because it was devastated by a typhoon.

Etymology
The city was named after the tipolo (breadfruit) tree (Artocarpus blancoi), which was in abundance in the area.

History
Franciscan missionaries arrived in Antipolo in 1578, and built a small church on what is now Boso-Boso Church. They were soon replaced in 1591 by the Jesuits, who organized the village into a parish. By 1601, The Christian population of Antipolo had grown to about 3,000 as the indigenous Dumagat population dwindled and moved deeper into the interiors.

An uprising of Manila's Chinese residents reached Antipolo in 1602. It led to the razing of the church.

On March 25, 1626, the image now known as the Virgin of Antipolo was brought from Acapulco, New Spain (now Mexico) by Governor-General Juan Niño de Tabora, who relinquished the image to the Jesuits for Antipolo's church.

In 1650, the village was organized into a town and became part of Tondo Province. When the province was divided in 1853, Antipolo became a part of the District of San Mateo de los Montes, which later became the District of Morong.

The Recollects took over Antipolo in 1864. It was during these years that the Virgin of Antipolo gained a following of devotees. Devotees from Manila and nearby towns and provinces flocked to Antipolo on foot or on hammocks, trekking along mountain trails and springs.

During the First Republic, the town served as the capital of Morong, until it was occupied by the Americans on June 4, 1899; the Revolutionary Government then transferred Morong's capital to Tanay. Soon after, the Americans established a civil government in 1901, Valentin Sumulong became the first municipal president. On June 11, 1901, Antipolo was incorporated into the newly established Province of Rizal, which included towns of Morong District and Manila Province. In 1903, the nearby towns of Bosoboso and Teresa were merged with Antipolo. The town's territory was expanded again in 1913 to add the sitios of Mayamot and Bulao; just to lose Teresa six years later to become an independent municipality. The Manila Railroad Company (currently Philippine National Railways) inaugurated a railway service to Antipolo on December 24, 1908.

Long before the LRT Line 2 finally opened its services in Santolan in the Pasig-Marikina border in 2004, steam train services had once served those places in the past, even before World War II.

In Marikina, there is a street named "Daangbakal", also called by the names of "Shoe Avenue Extension", "Munding Avenue" and "Bagong Silang". There is also a similar "Daangbakal" in the San Mateo-Montalban (Rodriguez) area, and on the maps one can notice that the two roads should have been connected with each other. In fact, as the name suggests in Tagalog, these streets were once a single railway line. The two sides of the "Daangbakal" roads were once connected by a bridge in the San Mateo-Marikina border. However, as the railroad tracks have been largely ignored after the Japanese occupation and was transformed into separate highways, the railway connection was abandoned.

The old railroad tracks, called the Marikina Line, were connected from Tutuban station in Manila, passing through Tramo (Barangay Rosario, Pasig) coming all the way to the town of Marikina up to Montalban. On the northern end of the "Daangbakal" road in Montalban is a basketball court. That basketball court which stands today, surrounded by the Montalban Catholic Church and Cemetery, was once the railway station terminus of that particular line.

The present-day Santo Niño Elementary School in Marikina was said to be a train depot. And also it was said that a railroad station once stood in the Marikina City Sports Park.

The Marikina Line was completed in 1906, and continued its operation until 1936. It was said that the Japanese Imperial Army made use of this railway line during the Second World War. These railways were dismantled during the 1960s and were converted into ordinary roads.

Today, the citizens are dependent on tricycles, jeepneys, taxis, UV Express services, buses and AUVs, which contribute to the everyday unbearable traffic of Metropolitan Manila. Even now there is uncertainty concerning the Northrail project, which is to link Manila to the northern provinces of Luzon, owing to corruption within the project's construction.

Aside from the Marikina Line, two other lines have existed before but are now removed permanently. These are the Cavite Line, which passed through Paco, Parañaque, Bacoor and up to Naic, Cavite. Completed in 1908, its operation continued until 1936. The other is the Antipolo Line, which passed through Santa Mesa, Mandaluyong, Pasig, Cainta, Taytay, up to Antipolo near the "Hinulugang Taktak" Falls. Its operation ceased in 1917. There is a street named "Daangbakal" in Antipolo; there, as with the "Daangbakal" roads on Marikina and San Mateo, a railway line once existed. The railroad tracks also passed through what is now the Ortigas Avenue Extension.

World War II 
During the start of the Second World War in the Philippines, Antipolo became a refugee destination for many citizens from Manila and its suburbs who sought to avoid the Japanese invaders vying to occupy the Philippine capital. Also, two guerrilla units operated in the town against the Japanese. They were the Hunters ROTC under Miguel Ver and Terry Adevoso and the Marking Filipino and American Troops, which were established and led by Marcos Villa Agustin, more popularly known under the name Brig. Gen. Agustin Marking. Many inhabitants were tortured and killed by the Japanese, including Mayor Pascual Oliveros and his son Reynaldo, Padre Eusebio Carreon, Padre Ariston Ocampo, Sis. Ma. Elizabeth Cagulanas, RVM, Sis. Ma. Consuelo Recio, RVM; Ambrosio Masangkay, Alfonso Oliveros and Atty. Francisco C. Gedang Sr.

The liberation of Antipolo from the Japanese forces was bloody and devastating. On February 17, 1945, Mambugan, Antipolo was heavily bombarded by American planes. Antipolo residents evacuated to Sitio Colaique and up to the towns of Angono, Santolan and Marikina. To protect the image from being destroyed, Procopio Angeles, then the sacristan mayor, and members of the community brought with them the Virgin of Antipolo. The bombings on March 6–7, 1945, destroyed the church, and after twelve days of battle, the combined American and Filipino soldiers under the United States Army, Philippine Commonwealth Army and Philippine Constabulary and aided the local recognized guerrillas of the Hunters ROTC and Marking's Filipino-American Troops (MFAT) liberated the town on March 12, 1945. The general headquarters of the Philippine Commonwealth Army and Philippine Constabulary was stationed in Antipolo from March 1945 to June 1946 was built today and operates during and after the war was fought the Japanese and they helping guerrillas and Allies. After the war, a temporary church was built and the Virgin of Antipolo was returned from the Quiapo Church on October 15, 1945.

Postcolonial period 

Religious devotees began to flock to the town, and on May 6, 1947, the first procession of the Virgin of Antipolo was held, starting at the hills of Pinagmisahan. In the following year, a national committee was formed to undertake a nationwide fund-raising campaign to rebuild the Cathedral of Antipolo.

On June 15, 1952, Hinulugang Taktak was proclaimed a National Park by Pres. Elpidio Quirino, and on January 14, 1954, the Bishops of the Philippines proclaimed the Cathedral of Antipolo as the national shrine of the Virgin of Antipolo.

In the 1960s the town proper, or poblacion, was widened and the Sumulong Highway was constructed. In the 1970s, the Marikina-Infanta Road, better known as the Marcos Highway, was constructed, traversing the mountains of Antipolo.

The Roman Catholic Diocese of Antipolo was created on June 25, 1983, with Rev. Protacio G. Gungon, D.D. as the first bishop of the diocese.

Cityhood

On February 13, 1998, Republic Act No. 8508 was enacted, converting Antipolo into a component city. The conversion of the city was ratified in a plebiscite less than two months later on April 4, 1998.

A new provincial capitol for Rizal province was inaugurated in the city on March 4, 2009, though Antipolo was not yet officially designated as the capital of the province.

Highly urbanized city
On March 14, 2011, then-President Benigno Aquino III declared the city as a "highly-urbanized city" according to Proclamation No. 124 s. 2011. However, the proclamation has yet to be ratified in a plebiscite.

Contemporary
On June 19, 2020, President Rodrigo Duterte signed Republic Act No. 11475, a law transferring the capital and seat of government of the province of Rizal from Pasig to Antipolo. The law took effect 15 days after the official publication in newspaper of general circulation or in the Official Gazette. The official publication is June 22, 2020, and took effect on July 7, 2020. From 1901 up to that year, Pasig served as the de jure capital of the province of Rizal. But in 1975, it became part of Metro Manila and the capital and the seat of government remained in Pasig until 2009 when the provincial capitol was transferred to Antipolo with the new buildings as mentioned.

Geography
Antipolo is in the northern half of Rizal Province, close to its meridional center. It is located on the slopes of the Sierra Madre Mountain Range. Much of the city sits on a plateau averaging 200 meters. It has the second-largest city area in the province, with an area of 156.68 km2. The northern and southern sections of the city are in the dense forest areas of the Sierra Madre.

Antipolo is landlocked; it is bounded to the north by San Mateo and Rodriguez, to the east by Tanay, to the south by Angono, Taytay and Teresa, and to the west by Cainta and Marikina in Metro Manila.

The Bitukang Manok of Pasig—also known as the Parian Creek—had once linked the Marikina River with the Antipolo River before the Manggahan Floodway was built in 1986. The Parian Creek was actually connected to the Sapang Bato-Buli Creek (which serves as the boundary between Pasig's barangays Dela Paz-Manggahan-Rosario-Santa Lucia and the Municipality of Cainta), the Kasibulan Creek (situated at Vista Verde, Barangay San Isidro, Cainta), the Palanas Creek (leaving Antipolo through Barangay Muntindilao), the Bulaw Creek (on Barangay Mambungan, besides the Valley Golf and Country Club), and the "Hinulugang Taktak" Falls of Barangay Dela Paz (fed by the Taktak Creek passing close to the Antipolo town square), thus being the detached and long-abandoned Antipolo River.

From the early 17th century up to the period of Japanese imperialism, over a thousand Catholic devotees coming from "Maynilad" (Manila), "Hacienda Pineda" (Pasay), "San Juan del Monte", "Hacienda de Mandaloyon" (Mandaluyong), "Hacienda Mariquina" (Marikina), "Barrio Pateros", "Pueblo de Tagig" (Taguig), and "San Pedro de Macati" (Makati), followed the trail of the Parian Creek to the Pilgrimage Cathedral on the mountainous pueblo of Antipolo, Morong (the present-day Rizal Province).

The Antipoleños and several locals from the far-reached barrios of "Poblacion de San Mateo", "Montalban" (Rodriguez), "Monte de Tanhai" (Tanay), "Santa Rosa-Oroquieta" (Teresa), and "Punta Ibayo" (Baras), had also navigated this freshwater creek once to go down to the vast "Kapatagan" (Rice plains) of lowland Pasig. Even the marian processions of the Our Lady of Peace and Good Voyage passed this route back and forth eleven times.

The creek was also used during the British occupation of Manila from 1762 to 1764 by the British Army, under the leadership of General William Draper and Vice Admiral Sir Samuel Cornish, 1st Baronet, to transport their troops (including the Sepoys they brought from India) upstream to take over the nearby forest-surrounded villages of Cainta and Taytay. They even did an ambush at the "Plaza Central" in front of the Pasig Cathedral, and turned the Roman Catholic parish into their military headquarters, with the church's fortress-like "campanilla" (belfry) serving as a watchtower against Spanish defenders sailing from the walled city of Intramuros via the Pasig River.

The Sepoys turned against their British lieutenants and sided with the combined forces of the Spanish conquistadors (assigned by the Governor-General Simon de Anda y Salazar), local rice farmers, fisherfolk, and Chinese traders. After the British invasion, the Sepoys remained and intermarried with Filipina women, which explains the Indian features of some of today's citizens of Pasig, especially Cainta and Taytay.

Climate

Barangays

Antipolo is politically divided into 16 barangays. The area where the boundaries of Barangays Dela Paz, San Isidro, San Jose and San Roque meet is the city proper or locally referred to as bayan.

Demographics

Antipolo's population in the 2015 census was enumerated at 776,386 inhabitants. It grew at an annual rate of 4.19 percent from the 2000 figure. Annual population growth rate has slowed relatively remains above the annual national average of 2.04 percent. The 2007 figure is three times the population of the city in 1990.

Residents of the city are mainly Tagalogs. Very minor communities of the indigenous Dumagat people are found in Barangay Calawis and sitios Old Boso-Boso, San Isidro, San Jose and Kaysakat in Barangay San Jose.

Economy

Antipolo is classified as a First Class City as of last local government income classification of the Department of Finance in 2008. In 2007, the city registered a total revenue of ₱993.1 million, an increase of 5.6 percent from the previous fiscal year; in 2010 this amount has grown to ₱1.56 billion. Its proximity to Metro Manila has continuously spurred the growth of the real estate industry and by 2007, revenue from real property taxes has ballooned by 32.1 percent from 2006 to ₱146.2 million as there are also about 456 residential subdivisions in the city.

Local government

Similar to other cities in the Philippines, the government structure of Antipolo is prescribed in the Local Government Code of 1991, and further codified in its city charter. It is headed by a city mayor, who serves as its chief executive and exercises overall supervision of its administrative agencies.

Its second-highest official, the city vice mayor, primarily serves as presiding officer of the Sangguniang Panlungsod and assumes the position of city mayor in the event of its vacancy. As presiding officer of the Sangguniang Panlungsod, the vice mayor does not vote except in cases to break a tie.

Sangguniang Panlungsod
The city's Sangguniang Panlungsod or city council is composed of 16 elected members, two ex officio officers and an option to have at most three sectoral representatives. The 16 barangays Antipolo is divided into are grouped into two districts. Each of these districts elect at-large eight city councilors, while the two ex officio officers are the city's Liga ng mga Barangay president and Sangguniang Kabataan Federation president.

Apart from legislating city ordinances, it also reviews the ordinances enacted by its barangays and makes recommendations for modification if they are found to be inconsistent with existing laws and city ordinances. On the other hand, ordinances and certain resolutions of the Sangguniang Panlungsod are transmitted to the Sangguniang Panlalawigan of Rizal for compliance review.

Elective city officials serve a term of three years and may serve up to three consecutive terms.

Representation
Antipolo's barangays are grouped into two legislative districts. Each district elects a representative each to the Sangguniang Panlalawigan and the House of Representatives.

Mayors

Education
The Department of Education maintains a school division in Antipolo, which supervises the 65 public schools (45 elementary schools, 20 high schools) in addition to 193 accredited private schools.

There are four universities/college operating satellite campuses in the city, the state-run University of Rizal System, Antipolo Institute of Technology, De La Salle College of Saint Benilde and Our Lady of Fatima University.

Public schools
 Antipolo National High School
Mambugan National High School

See also
Antipolo Cathedral
Legislative districts of Antipolo City
Marikina
Our Lady of Peace and Good Voyage
Roman Catholic Diocese of Antipolo
St. James Community School

References

External links

 
 Antipolo Philippines
 [ Philippine Standard Geographic Code]
 Philippine Census Information
 Local Governance Performance Management System

 
Cities in Calabarzon
Provincial capitals of the Philippines
Populated places in Rizal
Populated places established in 1650
1650 establishments in the Philippines
Catholic pilgrimage sites
Component cities in the Philippines